The Mazda Premacy Hydrogen RE Hybrid or Mazda5 Hydrogen RE Hybrid was a hydrogen powered hybrid car produced by Mazda. Later models were also called the Mazda Hydrogen RE Plug in Hybrid. The first car was unveiled in 2005, with an improved version shown at the 2007 Tokyo Motor Show.  Mazda planned for the car to enter production and leased a few cars to end users in 2009 in 2010.

Background
Mazda launched its first hydrogen-powered concept car, the HR-X, in 1991. The car was followed by other models, refining their technology over the following decade until the Mazda RX-8 Hydrogen RE of 2003. This car was the first hydrogen-powered rotary-engined vehicle to be offered on a commercial lease in Japan and was used in the Norwegian HyNor project to demonstrate the viability of hydrogen as a vehicle fuel.

Design

2005 model
Realising the limitations of these smaller vehicles, Mazda developed a hydrogen vehicle based on the successful Premacy compact MPV.  Mazda had previously produced the prototype Premacy FCEV in 2001 but this had been powered by a fuel cell. The new model was different and was designed to demonstrate a vehicle that could make hydrogen power mainstream. The drivetrain was taken from the Mazda RX-8 Hydrogen RE but had a 40% increase in power and increased range. Power was provided by a two rotor REGENESIS Wankel engine of  capacity combined with a  electric motor. Energy was stored in a petrol tank, hydrogen storage tank and nickel metal hydride battery, and the front mounted engine drove the front wheels. The battery was recharged by regenerative braking and provided some power to increase acceleration as in a mild hybrid.

Internally, the car was equipped with three rows of seats, with the additional components, including the electric motor and hydrogen storage tanks having limited impact on the internal space. The car was first unveiled at the 2005 Tokyo Motor Show, with a vision to be in showrooms by 2008.

2007 model
An improved version was unveiled at the 2007 Tokyo Motor Show. This vehicle had a range of different features, not least that although motors were still mounted at the front, drive was to the rear. Similarly, rather than use a gearbox, drive was through the electric motor, creating a series hybrid vehicle drivetrain.

While running on hydrogen, the Wankel engine produced  and up to  torque at 5000 rpm. While running on petrol, the engine produced  and  torque at the same engine speed. The battery was not designed to be a major energy source, providing limited range, but the car was fitted with an external plug for recharging.

Performance

Production
The car was produced in small numbers for demonstration in Japan. The first lease for a Premacy Hydrogen RE Hybrid started in March 2009. The first car was delivered to Iwatani Corporation on 26 May 2009. By January 2010, the company had leased five vehicles to end users.

See also
List of Mazda vehicles
List of hydrogen internal combustion engine vehicles

References

External links
2007 prototype image gallery at favcars.com
Cars introduced in 2005
Compact MPVs
Hybrid electric cars
Hydrogen cars
Premacy Hydrogen RE Hybrid